Matthew Spencer may refer to:
 Matthew Lyle Spencer (1881–1969), American minister, writer, and professor
 Matthew Spencer (footballer) (born 1985), Australian rules footballer
Matthew Spencer (born 1997), Canadian ice hockey player

See also
 Matthew S. Petersen (Matthew Spencer Petersen, born 1970), member of the US Federal Election Commission